Cartoon Network: Punch Time Explosion is a 2011 crossover fighting video game developed by Papaya Studio and published by Crave Games, for the Nintendo 3DS. It features characters from various Cartoon Network programs battling against one another. The game was released in June 2011 in North America and in April 2012 in Europe. An upgraded port, Cartoon Network: Punch Time Explosion XL, was released for the Wii, PlayStation 3, and Xbox 360 less than a year later.

Gameplay 
Cartoon Network: Punch Time Explosion is a platform fighter, with up to four players moving and battling on a 2D plane and trying to knock their opponents out of the arena.
Each playable character has a unique set of moves they can use to attack their opponents, performed by pressing a direction in combination with one of the attack buttons. When players strike one another, glowing cubes will fall out of them; collecting these cubes will gradually fill the player's special meter. When full, the player can use their character's "Punch Time Explosion", a powerful attack that can deal heavy damage to multiple opponents. For example, Ben Tennyson turns into Ultimate Humungosaur and launches missiles all over the stage. Players can also use various items that appear randomly on the stage to attack their opponents, including an item that summons one of 19 assist characters (22 in the XL version) to aid the player. In the XL version, playable characters can team up with certain assist characters and do Synergy attacks. For example, Chowder eats a plate of Madame Foster's cookies and becomes morbidly obese as the latter rolls him around the stage. Players can choose between 21 different stages for battles (26 in the XL version). Many stages shift between multiple phases as the battle continues, and players may use stage elements in order to take out other players. For example, in the Dexter's Laboratory stage, players can pull two different levers, with one activating a conveyor belt and the other firing a deadly laser.

Playable characters 
Players can choose from 18 playable characters drawn from 11 Cartoon Network programs. An additional eight characters were added to the XL version for a total of 26.

Ben 10
 Ben Tennyson
 Young Ben Tennyson
 Kevin Levin
 Vilgax
Captain Planet and the Planeteers
 Captain Planet
Chowder
 Chowder & Kimchi
Codename: Kids Next Door
 Numbuh One
 Father
 Toiletnator
Dexter's Laboratory
 Dexter
 Monkey
Foster's Home for Imaginary Friends
 Mac & Bloo

The Grim Adventures of Billy & Mandy
 Billy & Mandy
 Grim
 Hoss Delgado
Johnny Bravo
 Johnny Bravo
The Marvelous Misadventures of Flapjack
 Flapjack
 Captain K'nuckles
The Powerpuff Girls
 Blossom
 Bubbles
 Buttercup
 Mojo Jojo
 Him
Samurai Jack
 Samurai Jack
 The Scotsman
 Aku

Plot 
An unseen announcer prepares to watch some television on his day off as he tunes into Cartoon Network. However, he discovers that an unknown force is causing chaos in the respective universes of some of its programs, with villains traversing between them and many heroes becoming corrupted. The announcer watches the events unfold, beginning with Ben Tennyson traveling to the Chowder universe in pursuit of Vilgax. Ben restores a corrupted Chowder, but Vilgax escapes and the Chowder universe is engulfed in static. Chowder and Ben are then pulled into the Ben 10 universe, where they are attacked by a corrupted Buttercup. She too is restored and, after a battle with the mutated Kevin Levin, the dimension begins to fade as well. However, Dexter arrives in a dimension-traveling capsule and rescues them. The allied heroes then use the capsule to travel to the network's programs one by one, defeating the displaced villains while restoring the corrupted heroes and recruiting them to their cause before their respective dimensions are terminated.

Having gathered a large team of heroes, the capsule prepares to make one more warp to save the dimensions, but it is destroyed as the heroes are intercepted by the mastermind behind the events – the announcer's remote control – which has become sentient. The device prepares to eliminate the heroes, but they inadvertently summon Captain Planet, who rescues them. Working together, the heroes defeat the remote control and it reverts back to its inanimate state. Dexter reinsert its batteries, restoring the balance between the dimensions and returning everyone home. The announcer laments about having to change the channel himself now that he no longer has a remote, but begins pondering the idea of getting someone else to change the channel for him instead.

Home console version 
On 3 October 2011, Papaya Studio announced a home console version of the game, titled Cartoon Network: Punch Time Explosion XL, which was released for the Wii, PlayStation 3, and Xbox 360. XL adds eight new playable characters to the roster, four of whom were assist characters in the 3DS version. The port also adds seven new assist characters, five new stages, and additional gameplay modes. An in-game shop allows players to purchase new playable characters, stages, alternate costumes, and clips from the various Cartoon Network shows represented in the game. Alterations were made to the game's story mode to accommodate the new character additions. XL also revised parts of the game's voice acting, with some characters who were not voiced by their original actors on the 3DS version getting new voice clips by their actors from their respective series.

The European release of the game was delayed until nearly a year after the North American release. The game was released on 18 May 2012, in the UK; on 14 June 2012, in France; and on 22 August 2012, in Italy and Spain via the PlayStation Store.

Reception 

Cartoon Network: Punch Time Explosion received mixed reviews. Jack DeVries of IGN gave the game a rating of 4.5 and said "the fun comes in very small doses", and felt that "the levels, though aesthetically varied, are basic and boring", negatively comparing its gameplay to that of the Super Smash Bros. series. The game was also criticized for not using many recent Cartoon Network characters and using characters from series that have ended prior to the game's release, with Ben 10: Ultimate Alien being the only ongoing series at the time of release, as well as not using other popular former Cartoon Network characters like Courage the Cowardly Dog and Ed, Edd n Eddy.

The XL version of the game was slightly better received. IGN's Jack DeVries gave the XL version a rating of 5.0, saying that "Having so many characters in one game is cool, but the story is the laziest way to do it".

See also 
 MultiVersus
 Nickelodeon All-Star Brawl

References

External links 
 
 Cartoon Network: Punch Time Explosion at IGN
 Interview about Punch Time Explosion

2011 video games
Cartoon Network video games
Crossover fighting games
Fighting games
Multiplayer and single-player video games
Nintendo 3DS games
PlayStation 3 games
Platform fighters
Video games developed in the United States
Video games set in the United States
Video games about parallel universes
Wii games
Xbox 360 games
Science fantasy video games
Deep Silver games
Crave Entertainment games
Papaya Studio games